Broby is a locality and the seat of Östra Göinge Municipality, Scania County, Sweden with 3,561 inhabitants in 2020.

References 

Populated places in Östra Göinge Municipality
Populated places in Skåne County
Municipal seats of Skåne County
Swedish municipal seats